Pyatiletka is a rural locality (a village) in Austrumsky Selsoviet, Iglinsky District, Bashkortostan, Russia. The population was 238 as of 2010.

Geography 
It is located 50 km from Iglino and 14 km from Austrum.

References 

Rural localities in Iglinsky District